Mel Davis was an American multi-instrumental musician and arranger, best known for his trumpet playing. He also played piano, violin, drums, tuba, bass, accordion and ocarina.  He was also known as a vocalist. He was born in Philadelphia in 1931 and died in Florida on December 28, 2004. He was the owner of Mel’s place in Baldwin, New York, a jazz club on Long Island.

Early career
Davis began his musical apprenticeship under Seymour Rosenfeld, who was a long-time trumpet player with the Philadelphia Orchestra. He played in clubs from the age of twelve but completed high school before taking a job playing with the St. Louis Symphonette. While continuing to play club gigs, Davis furthered his musical knowledge by studying at Curtis Institute of Music and Temple University.

He recorded many albums, including Trumpet with a Soul, released on the Epic label in 1956. It featured Milt Hinton on bass and Osie Johnson on drums. Later, he formed a band called "The Lease Breakers" with  Buddy Morrow, Harvey Phillips, Tony Mottola and Sol Gubin.

Then in the mid-1950s, he left Philadelphia for New York where he joined the Benny Goodman band as lead trumpet player, travelling with the band on their tour of the Far East in 1956.

Session work
Davis' reliability saw him taking up unsung positions as a session musician. He was the house trumpeter with Command Records and worked a stint as one of NBC's staff musicians, as well as being one of the original and long time Sesame Street band-members, where he stayed for seventeen years. Davis also appeared on the "Tonight Show" with Doc Severinsen, as well as the Perry Como Show. 
 
He appeared on many albums including Billie Holiday’s Lady in Satin (1958), Neal Hefti's Pardon my Doo-Wah (1958), George Benson's The Other Side of Abbey Road (1969) and Lynn Roberts' tribute to Harry James.

Mel Davis also provided scores for at least two independent films, both directed by Jon Moritsugu, Fame Whore (1997) and Scumrock (2002).

Davis ran a club called "Rampart Street" in Port Washington and retired to Florida where he died in 2004, aged 73.

References

Musicians' Union website '802afm' provided a bio at the time of his death, from which much of this article is drawn:
https://web.archive.org/web/20100713033355/http://www.local802afm.org/publication_entry.cfm?xEntry=36439325

Album credits:
http://vinyl4giants.blogspot.com/2009/01/george-benson-other-side-of-abbey-road.html
http://www.jazzwax.com/2009/07/index.html

Film Credits:
https://www.imdb.com/name/nm2658026/

1931 births
2004 deaths
American trumpeters
American male trumpeters
20th-century American musicians
20th-century trumpeters
20th-century American male musicians